Bascanichthys ceciliae is an eel in the family Ophichthidae (worm/snake eels). It was described by Jacques Blache and Jean Cadenat in 1971. It is a tropical, marine eel which is known from the eastern coastal Atlantic Ocean between Senegal and Angola. It inhabits shallow waters where it burrows in sand; the burrows are sometimes exposed during low tide. It can reach a maximum total length of 82.5 centimetres, but more commonly reaches a TL of 60 cm.

References

Ophichthidae
Fish of the Atlantic Ocean
Taxa named by Jean Cadenat
Fish described in 1971